The MS Finbo Cargo is a roll-on/roll-off passenger ferry that was previously called the European Endeavour which was owned and operated by P&O Ferries until May 2019. Eckerö Line purchased the ship from P&O in 2019 and is expected to take delivery in June 2019 and renamed her MS Finbo Cargo.

P&O took delivery of the ship in October 2007 from Acciona Trasmediterránea. She was the second P&O ship to have carried the name European Endeavour.

History
The ship was built in 2000 for Merchant Ferries as Midnight Merchant for a planned service between Liverpool and Belfast, however, the ship was chartered to Norfolkline for their new service between Dover and Dunkirk and remained on that route until July 2006 when she was replaced by Maersk Dover, a newbuild.

In August 2006, she was chartered to Acciona Trasmediterránea for service in the Mediterranean and renamed El Greco registered under the Spanish flag.

On 26 June 2007, it was announced that P&O Ferries had agreed to purchase the ship in order to meet the growing demand for space from haulage customers throughout its operations. The ship will primarily be used on the Dover–Calais route but also on P&O Ferries Irish Sea and North Sea routes to cover for the refit of other vessels. The ship entered service with P&O on their Liverpool-Dublin route on 6 November 2007.

The ship has been involved in two incidents. On 22 March 2008, the ships mooring ropes parted resulting is her drifting across the eastern entrance of Dover Harbour. The ship was assisted back to her berth by a Dover Harbour tug. On 29 August 2008, the ship suffered a partial loss of electrical power, which resulted in a collision with Linkspan 7 in Calais. European Endeavours 'cow catcher', a metal structure welded to the bow to support the bow ramp when deployed, was demolished and significant damage was caused to the linkspan.

Due to a downturn in freight traffic P&O Ferries laid up the ship in Tilbury in May 2010. She was chartered to DFDS Seaways in August 2010 and early September 2010 to provide refit cover on the Birkenhead–Dublin and Belfast routes. On completion of this charter the ship was sent for its annual overhaul and then proceeded to Dunkerque for layup. She remained in Dunkerque until early February 2011, when she sailed for Liverpool in preparation for returning to service on the Liverpool-Dublin service replacing the M/V Norcape.

In May 2019, P&O sold European Endeavour to Eckerö Line. She is to act as a complement to Eckerö's current vessel the Finlandia on the Helsinki to Tallinn Route commencing in June berthing at Vuosaari on the outskirts of Helsinki. She will join the service following another dry docking with an increased capacity of 366 passengers. She only left the dry dock at Cammell Laird on 2 May 2019, in what looks like the last dry dock visit as a P&O vessel.

Regular routes
Dover–Dunkirk October 2000 - July 2006.
Barcelona - Palma de Mallorca August - October 2006.
Barcelona/Valencia-Palma de Mallorca/Ibiza/Maó October 2006 - September 2007.
Dover-Calais 11 January 2008 - May 2010.
Liverpool - Dublin From February 2011 to May 2019.
Helsinki - Tallinn from June 2019

It was P&O's intention that the ship would primarily be used between Dover and Calais but would also cover the refits of other ships on the following routes:-Hull-RotterdamHull-ZeebruggeLiverpool-Dublin 6 November 2007 – 16 December 2007Tilbury - Zeebrugge' January 2009.

It was discovered that the ship was too wide to fit through the lock at Hull so she did not serve the routes from that port as intended. She was briefly used on a re-established Dover-Zeebrugge route but the service only lasted for one day due to lack of freight.

Sister ships

 MS Kaiarahi
MV Cracovia - heavily modified sister ship
 MV Isle of Inisheer
 AQUARIUS BRASIL (ex NORMAN BRIDGE / AVE LIEPAJA / BRAVE MERCHANT) imo: 9147306 (now accommodation vessel)

References

External links

 P&O Ferries official site

Ferries of the United Kingdom
Ferries of France
1999 ships
Ships of P&O Ferries
Ferries of Finland